William R. Foley (May 11, 1908 – June 17, 1988) was an American lawyer and politician.

Born in Superior, Wisconsin, Foley went to the Superior State Teachers College and then received his law degree from University of Wisconsin Law School in 1931. From 1935 to 1941, he was an attorney in Washington, D.C. for the Reconstruction Finance Corporation. Foley then returned to Superior, Wisconsin to continue his law practice. In 1943, Foley served in the Wisconsin State Assembly as a Progressive. During World War II he served in the United States Armed Forces. Foley died in Los Angeles, California.

Notes

1908 births
1988 deaths
Politicians from Superior, Wisconsin
Military personnel from Wisconsin
University of Wisconsin–Superior alumni
University of Wisconsin Law School alumni
Wisconsin lawyers
Wisconsin Progressives (1924)
Members of the Wisconsin State Assembly
20th-century American politicians
20th-century American lawyers